Michael Raffl (born 1 December 1988) is an Austrian professional ice hockey left winger currently with Lausanne HC of the Swiss National League (NL). He previously played in the National Hockey League (NHL) for the Philadelphia Flyers, Washington Capitals and Dallas Stars, as well as EC VSV in the Austrian ICE Hockey League (IceHL).

Early life 
Raffl was born on 1 December 1988 in Villach, Austria, to a hockey-playing family. His father Peter played with the Villacher SV (EC VSV) for 22 years, and served as head coach of the town's under-20 ice hockey team. Raffl and his older brother Thomas spent most of their childhood in the Villacher Stadthalle arena. Raffl said that it was "pretty popular to play hockey" in Villach, "but it wasn't professional", and it was difficult for players to head overseas and play in the National Hockey League (NHL). Growing up, he was close friends with future NHL player Michael Grabner, who lived "a two-minute walk" away from the Raffls.

Playing career
As a youth, Raffl played in the 2002 Quebec International Pee-Wee Hockey Tournament with a team from Austria.

NHL

Philadelphia Flyers 
On 31 May 2013 Raffl signed a one-year, entry-level contract with the Philadelphia Flyers. He began the 2013–14 season with the Flyers AHL affiliate, the Adirondack Phantoms. He was recalled to the NHL on 12 October, and he scored his first career NHL goal on 9 December 2013, against Craig Anderson of the Ottawa Senators.

Raffl signed a two-year contract extension with the Flyers worth $2.2 million on 22 March 2014. Through the second year of his contract with the Flyers in the 2015–16 season, Raffl was signed remain with the organization in agreeing to a three-year deal on February 29, 2016.

Raffl's 2016–17 season was riddled with injuries and he only appeared in a career-low 52 games that season. In October 2016, Raffl was placed on injured reserve to recover from an upper-body injury. In March 2017, Raffl was injured in a game against the Colorado Avalanche and was set to be out for 6–8 weeks.

Raffl signed a two-year contract extension with the Flyers on March 26, 2019.

On 3 December 2019, Raffl suffered a broken finger in a 6–1 game against the Toronto Maple Leafs. He was ruled out for approximately four weeks.

On November 28, 2020, Raffl was loaned by the Flyers to Villacher SV in the ICE Hockey League until the commencement of the delayed 2020–21 North American season. He played four games there before he was recalled to the Flyers.

Washington Capitals 
At the NHL trade deadline on April 12, 2021, the Flyers traded Raffl to the Washington Capitals in exchange for a fifth-round draft pick. His debut with the team was delayed after suffering an upper-body injury with the Flyers, and he began practicing with the team on April 21. Raffl made his team debut the following day, replacing Daniel Sprong in a 1–0 shootout victory against the New York Islanders.

Dallas Stars 
On July 29, 2021, the Dallas Stars signed Raffl to a one-year, $1.1 million contract. In the  season, Raffl established himself within the Stars checking-line, making 76 regular season appearance in collecting 7 goals and 16 points. He added 2 goals and 3 points in the playoffs, exiting in a game 7 defeat to the Calgary Flames in the first-round.

Return to Europe
Unable to agree on a contract extension with the Stars, Raffl left as a free agent and returned to Europe in agreeing to a two-year contract with Swiss club, Lausanne HC of the NL on 4 August 2022.

International play
Raffl participated at the 2009 and 2011 IIHF World Championship as a member of the Austria men's national ice hockey team, and was also named to team Austria for the 2014 Winter Olympics.

Personal life
Raffl's father, Peter, is a former player who spent the entirety of his career in Austria. His brother Thomas currently plays for EC Red Bull Salzburg of EBEL. Raffl is close friends with Flyers' teammate Scott Laughton and assisted Laughton with his proposal to fiancée Chloe.

Career statistics

Regular season and playoffs

International

References

External links

 

1988 births
Living people
Adirondack Phantoms players
Austrian ice hockey left wingers
Dallas Stars players
EC VSV players
Ice hockey players at the 2014 Winter Olympics
Lausanne HC players
Leksands IF players
Olympic ice hockey players of Austria
Sportspeople from Villach
Philadelphia Flyers players
Undrafted National Hockey League players
Washington Capitals players
Austrian expatriate ice hockey people
Expatriate ice hockey players in the United States
Expatriate ice hockey players in Sweden
Expatriate ice hockey players in Switzerland
Austrian expatriate sportspeople in the United States
Austrian expatriate sportspeople in Sweden
Austrian expatriate sportspeople in Switzerland